Achatinidae (New Latin, from Greek "agate") is a family of medium to large sized tropical land snails, terrestrial pulmonate gastropod mollusks from Africa.

Well known species include Achatina achatina the Giant African Snail, and Lissachatina fulica the Giant East African Snail.

As of 2022, there were 105 genera recognized within the family Achatinidae.

Description
In this family, the number of haploid chromosomes lies between 26 and 30 (according to the values in this table).

Distribution
The native distribution of Achatinidae is Africa south of the Sahara.

Taxonomy
As of 2022, the family Achatinidae contains the following subfamilies:
 Achatininae Swainson, 1840 - synonyms: Urceidae Chaper, 1884; Ampullidae Winckworth, 1945
 Coeliaxinae Pilsbry, 1907
 Cryptelasminae Germain, 1916
 Glessulinae Godwin-Austin, 1920
 Opeatinae Thiele, 1931
 Petriolinae Schileyko, 1999
 Pyrgininae Germain, 1916
 Rishetiinae Schileyko, 1999
 Rumininae Wenz, 1923
 Stenogyrinae P. Fischer & Crosse, 1877
 Subulininae P. Fischer & Crosse, 1877
 Thyrophorellinae Girard, 1895

Genera 

The following genera are recognised in the family Achatinidae:
 
Achatininae
 Achatina Lamarck, 1799 - type genus of the family Achatinidae
 Archachatina Albers, 1850
 Atopocochlis Crosse & P. Fischer, 1888
 Bequaertina Mead, 1994
 Brownisca Mead, 2004
 Bruggenina Mead, 2004
 Burtoa Bourguignat, 1889
 Callistoplepa Ancey, 1888
 Cochlitoma Férussac, 1821
 Columna Perry, 1811
 Leptocala Ancey, 1888
 Leptocalina Bequaert, 1950
 Leptocallista Pilsbry, 1904
 Lignus Gray, 1834
 Limicolaria Schumacher, 1817
 Limicolariopsis d'Ailly, 1910
 Lissachatina Bequaert, 1950
 Metachatina Pilsbry, 1904
 Pseudachatina Albers, 1850

Coeliaxinae
 Balfouria Crosse, 1884
 Coeliaxis H. Adams & Angas, 1865
 Ischnocion Pilsbry, 1907
 Nannobeliscus Weyrauch, 1967
 Neosubulina Smith, 1898
 Riebeckia von Martens, 1883

Cryptelasminae
 Cryptelasmus Pilsbry, 1907
 Thomea Girard, 1893

Glessulinae
 Glessula Martens, 1860

Opeatinae
 Eremopeas Pilsbry, 1906
 Opeas Albers, 1850

Petriolinae
 Aporachis  D. T. Holyoak, 2020
 Bocageia Girard, 1893
 Ceras Dupuis & Putzeys, 1901
 Chilonopsis Fischer de Waldheim, 1848
 Cleostyla Dall, 1896
 Comoropeas Pilsbry, 1906
 Dictyoglessula Pilsbry, 1919
 Homorus Albers, 1850
 Ischnoglessula Pilsbry, 1919
 Itiopiana Preston, 1910
 Kempioconcha Preston, 1913
 Liobocageia Pilsbry, 1919
 Mabilliella Ancey, 1886
 Nothapalinus Connolly, 1923
 Nothapalus von Martens, 1897
 Oleata Ortiz de Zarate, 1959
 Oreohomorus Pilsbry, 1919
 Petriola Dall, 1905
 Subuliniscus Pilsbry, 1919
 Subulona Martens, 1889

Pyrgininae
 Pseudobalea Shuttleworth, 1854
 Pyrgina Greef, 1882

Rishetiinae
 Bacillum Theobald, 1840
 Eutomopeas Pilsbry, 1946
 Rishetia Godwin-Austen, 1920
 Tortaxis Pilsbry, 1906

Rumininae
 Krapfiella Preston, 1911
 Lubricetta Haas, 1928
 Namibiella Zilch, 1954
 Rumina Risso, 1826
 Xerocerastus Kobelt & Möllendorff, 1902

Stenogyrinae
 Chryserpes Pilsbry, 1906
 Cupulella Aguayo & Jaume, 1948
 †Cylindrogyra Repelin, 1902
 Dolicholestes Pilsbry, 1906
 Lyobasis Pilsbry, 1903
 Neobeliscus Pilsbry, 1896
 †Nisopsis Matheron, 1888
 Obeliscus Beck, 1837 
 Ochroderma Ancey, 1885
 Ochrodermatina Thiele, 1931
 Ochrodermella Pilsbry, 1907
 Plicaxis Sykes, 1903
 Promoussonius Pilsbry, 1906
 Protobeliscus Pilsbry, 1906
 Rhodea Adams & Adams, 1855
 Stenogyra Shuttleworth, 1854
 Synapterpes Pilsbry, 1896
 Zoniferella Pilsbry, 1906

Subulininae
 Allopeas H. B. Baker, 1935
 Beckianum Baker, 1961
 Curvella Chaper, 1885
 Dysopeas Baker, 1927
 Euonyma Melvill & Ponsonby, 1896
 Fortuna Schlickum & Strauch, 1972
 Hypolysia Melvill & Ponsonby, 1901
 Lamellaxis Strebel & Pfeffer, 1882
 Lavajatus Simone, 2018
 Leptinaria Beck, 1837
 Leptopeas Baker, 1927
 Micropeas Connolly, 1923
 Neoglessula Pilsbry, 1909
 †Opetiopsis S.-Y. Guo, 1983
 Paropeas Pilsbry, 1906
 Pelatrinia Pilsbry, 1907
 Prosopeas Mörch, 1876
 Pseudoglessula Boettger, 1892
 Pseudopeas Putzeys, 1899
 Striosubulina Thiele, 1933
 Subulina Beck, 1837
 Vegrandinia Salvador, Cunha & Simone, 2013
 Zootecus Westerlund, 1887

Thyrophorellinae
 Thyrophorella Greeff, 1882

Other subfamilies
 †Arabicolaria Harzhauser & Neubauer, 2016
 †Pacaudiella Harzhauser & Neubauer, 2016

References

External links
 
 
 Achatinidae
 Extensive information on Achatina and Archachatina in captivity with a helpful forum.
 US Dept of Agriculture

 
Extant Pleistocene first appearances
Gastropod families